(born November 23, 1981) is a Japanese former professional racing cyclist.

Career
Shimizu was born in Saitama Prefecture. After beginning cycling at Hatoyama High School, he attended the National Institute of Fitness and Sports in Kanoya before becoming a professional in 2004. Shimizu was in general considered an all-rounder. His victory at Paris–Corrèze in 2008, the first of a UCI category 1 stage race by a Japanese, has been termed "epoch making." In 2014, he was chosen to represent Japan at the 2014 UCI Road World Championships in the men's road race. He announced he would retire at the end of the 2014 season.

Major results

2005
 3rd Overall Tour de Hokkaido
2007
 1st  Overall Vuelta Ciclista a León
1st Stage 1
2008
 1st  Overall Tour de Kumano
1st Stages 2 & 3
 1st  Overall Paris–Corrèze
1st Stage 1
 2nd Overall Tour de Okinawa
2009
 3rd Kumamoto International Road Race
2010
 1st  Overall Tour de Martinique
1st Stage 7
 1st  Overall Tour de Hokkaido
1st Stage 2
 1st Stage 2 Tour de Taiwan
2011
 2nd Overall Tour of Thailand
 3rd Road race, National Road Championships
2012
 3rd Road race, National Road Championships
2013
 1st  Mountains classification Tour Alsace
 2nd Road race, National Road Championships
 3rd Overall Tour de Guadeloupe
1st  Combination classification
1st  Mountains classification
2014
 3rd Overall Tour International de Constantine
 3rd Circuit International d'Alger
 8th Overall Tour International de Sétif

References

External links

Bridgestone Anchor Cycling Team (official blog, Japanese)

1981 births
Living people
Japanese male cyclists
Sportspeople from Saitama Prefecture